Werner Baßler (2 October 1921 – 21 October 1999) was a German footballer who played as a forward.

Early life 
Baßler's footballing career started at the youth side of 1. FC Kaiserslautern, where he played with Fritz Walter and Richard Schneider. Werner was a multi-talented athlete who played handball, track, field and he also cycled.

Career

Gauliga 
In 1938 he appeared in the first team of 1. FC Kaiserslautern. In the 1939/1940 season were the champions of the Saarpfalz region in the Gauliga Südwest, however couldn't advance to the finals of the German Championship, after losing 4:7 on aggregate to Kickers Offenbach. In the 1941/1942 Gauliga Westmark season, Werner scored 21 goals. For the first time 1. FC Kaiserslautern advanced to the German Championship. On May 10, 1942, 1. FC Kaiserslautern beat SV Waldhof Mannheim 7:1 with Werner scoring a goal. Unfortunately 1. FC Kaiserslautern could not progress further, as they lost 3:9, on aggregate, to a Schalke side that boasted the likes of Fritz Szepan and Ernst Kuzorra.

Werner was drafted into the navy in 1942 and would play as a war-guest for Holstein Kiel for two seasons. He would play just a few more games for 1. FC Kaiserslautern before the introduction of the Oberliga

Oberliga 
Werner's first game in the Oberliga came against Phoenix Ludwigshafen, Werner scored 3 in a 10–0 victory. Up until 1950/1951, 1. FC Kaiserslautern would win four Oberliga Sudwest championships. 1947/1948 was a great year for 1. FC Kaiserslautern, as they won the championship with a 151:18 ratio of goalscored to goals conceded. Werner ended up with 28 goals in the championship, which put him in 4th place. First place was none other than teammate Ottmar Walter with 51 goals. The next season would be even better for Werner as he totalled a record 54 goals for 1. FC Kaiserslautern. The following season Baßler scored another 45 goals, equal to Ottmar Walter. In 1951, Baßler finished with 25 goals, behind Ottmar Walter, who scored 28 goals. In 1951, together with the 1. FC Kaiserslautern team, he was awarded the Silver Laurel Leaf

In the Oberliga Südwest he played 215 games from 1945 to 1957, scoring 226 goals. Baßler played his last competitive game for the Red Devils in the final round of 1957 on June 9 in Hannover, against the defending champions Borussia Dortmund, when Lautern lost 2-3 goals in front of 75,000 spectators, he had to deal with the 23-year-old Borussia left winger Helmut Kapitulski.

Later life 
Baßler was employed as a construction mechanic by the sewing machine manufacturer Pfaff in Kaiserslautern and, after his return from Mannheim, also ran a lottery and pools acceptance point. According to his own records, Baßler scored at least 1388 goals during his career.

References

1921 births
1999 deaths